Cinemathique is the third album by collaborative band Tuatara.  The band expanded to eleven members on this album, and it was their first album for Barrett Martin's record label, Fast Horse Recordings.

Track listing

Musicians
Peter Buck - guitar, bass guitar
Joe Cripps - percussion
Craig Flory - saxophones, flute
Barrett Martin - drum kit, vibraphone, marimba, keyboards, guitar, bass
Scott McCaughey - guitar, keyboards, harmonica
Elizabeth Pupo-Walker - congas, other percussion
Skerik - saxophone
Chris Littlefield - trumpet, flugelhorn
Eric Richards - accordion
Alex Veley - piano, organ 
Justin Harwood - bass, keyboards

References

2001 albums
Tuatara (band) albums